Hepnar is a surname. Notable people with the surname include:

Josef Hepnar (born 1965), Czech ski mountaineer